Internet Matters is a not-for-profit organisation based in London, England. Launched in May 2014 by the United Kingdom's largest internet service providers BT, Sky, TalkTalk and Virgin Media, the organisation offers child internet safety advice to parents, carers and professionals.

The organisation partners with industry leaders and experts to create safer online spaces for children. Partnerships often include joint projects in research and general online safety. Internet Matters is often compared to Common Sense Media, NSPCC, and Childnet because of the similar work they do.

History 

Internet Matters was launched on 13 May 2014 with a launch event at the Museum of Childhood, Bethnal Green, London attended by guests including Sophie Ellis-Bextor and Janet Ellis and industry experts including Sonia Livingstone. At the time, David Cameron described the launch as 'a significant step forward in our mission to protect our children online'.

Internet Matters is supported by the largest internet service providers in the UK: BT, Sky, TalkTalk and Virgin Media. Between them they have direct relationships with 90% of internet households in the UK.

The not-for-profit also works closely with other child e-safety charities and industry bodies including the NSPCC, Childnet, FOSI, the CEOP and search engine Google.

Partners

Website 

The online portal gives information and guidance about the main e-safety issues children might be exposed to when browsing the internet. There is also advice for safeguarding and tips for setting up appropriate controls and filters in the portal.

The portal contains information for parents on the online issues of cyberbullying, inappropriate content, online pornography, online reputation, online grooming, sexting, self-harm, radicalisation and more. The site has published guidance to help parents understand information relevant to their child’s age, the latest in connected technologies, mobile applications, social networking and online gaming. It also has instructions for parents on how to set up parental controls and filters for specific broadband and mobile providers, devices and content providers.

Connecting Safely Online 
Connecting Safely Online is an initiative to help children and young people with learning difficulties tackle online safety issues. It was launched in 2020 alongside Youthworks and in partnership with Meta. Articles provide advice for parents and carers as well as teens using social media to help them understand how to get help when they need it.

Digital Matters 
Digital Matters is a free online safety learning platform designed for schools to teach children skills in online safety. It is split into two parts: Interactive Learning and Once Upon Online. Interactive Learning involves teacher-facilitated discussion and quiz-based learning while Once Upon Online is a choose-your-own-adventure story where children have to help characters find positive outcomes as they deal with online safety issues.

The platform provides teachers with free resources to teach the lessons, including a lesson plan, offline worksheets, guides and more. It was developed with support from Internet Matters' partner, ESET, and uses manga-style art.

Parents and children can also access the platform for free to utilise the online safety resources at home or in conjunction with schools. The platform can be downloaded as an app to smartphones, tablets and computers.

It is shortlisted for the Teach Primary 2022 awards in the App category.

Published research

Cybersafe (2013)
Cybersafe 2013 was a study commissioned to support the launch of Internet Matters. The findings of the study highlighted a clear demand for more information about the risks children face when accessing the internet, at the time of research 74% of parents surveyed stated they wanted to know more. Of the 74%, 18% wanted to learn more about filtering content and blocking access to specific websites

Back to School (2015)
Over 1000 UK parents were surveyed to identify at what age they thought a child owning a smartphone was OK. The survey revealed that the majority of parents (84.6%) would like a minimum age on smartphone ownership with 10 being the most popular age.

Pace of Change (2015)
Internet Matters commissioned Childwise to carry out a UK-wide study to explore the use and understanding of technology among children aged 7–17, and parents of children this age. The research revealed an increasing gap between parents and children online with the fact that children spent significantly longer online, with girls using smartphones on average 4 hours a day.

References

External links 
 Internet Matters
 Back to School (2015)
 Pace of Change report (2015)
 Cybersafe (2013)

Organizations established in 2014
2014 establishments in England
Internet-related organizations
Charities based in the United Kingdom